Neocollyris parvula is a species of ground beetle in the genus Neocollyris in the family Carabidae. It was described by Chaudoir in 1848.

References

Parvula, Neocollyris
Beetles described in 1848